The Shushtar Historical Hydraulic System is a complex irrigation system of the island city Shushtar from the Sassanid era. It consists of 13 dams, bridges, canals and structures which work together as a hydraulic system.

Located in Iran's Khuzestan Province. It was registered on UNESCO's list of World Heritage Sites in 2009 and is Iran's 10th cultural heritage site to be registered on the United Nations' list. 

This engineering masterpiece is unique both in Iran and in the world.The Sassanids, whose economy was mainly dependent on agriculture, developed extensive irrigation systems in this region. 

infrastructure included water mills, dams, tunnels, and canals. Gargar Bridge-Dam was built on the watermills and waterfalls. Bolayti canal is situated on the eastern side of the water mills and water falls and functions to supply water from behind the GarGar bridge to the east side of water mills and channel the water to prevent damage to the water mills. Dahaneye shahr tunnel (city orifice) is one of the three main tunnels which channeled the water from behind the Gargar Bridge-Dam into the water mill and then run several water mills. Seh kooreh canal channels the water from behind the GarGar bridge into the western side. In the water mills and water falls, we can see a perfect model of haltering to run mills.

Built by a Roman workforce in the 3rd century AD on Sassanid order, it was the most eastern Roman bridge and Roman dam and the first structure in Iran to combine a bridge with a dam.

Parts of the irrigation system are said to originally date to the time of Darius the Great, an Achaemenian king of Iran. It partly consists of a pair of primary diversion canals in the Karun river, one of which is still in use today. It delivers water to the Shushtar city via a route of supplying tunnels. The area includes Salasel Castle, which is the axis for operation of the hydraulic system. It also consists of a tower for water level measurement, along with bridges, dams, mills, and basins.

Then it enters the plain south of the city, where its impact includes enabling the possibility of farming over the area called Mianâb and planting orchards. In fact the whole area between the two diversion canals (Shutayt and Gargar) on Karun river is called Mianâb, an island having the Shushtar city at its northern end.

The site has been referred to as "a masterpiece of creative genius" by UNESCO.

Sites 
Shushtar Historical Hydraulic System is a complex of dams, bridges, canals and structures which consists of 13 sites which work together as a hydraulic system.

1. Mizan Dam

2. Kolah-Farangi Tower

3. Gargar Canal

4. Gargar Bridge-Dam

5. Watermills and Waterfalls area

6. Borj Ayar Bridge-Dam and Sabein Sanctuary

7. Khoda-Afrain Bridge-Dam

8. Salasel Castle

9. Dariun Canal

10. Shadorvan Bridge-Dam

11. Band-e Khak Dam

12. Lashkar Bridge-Dam

13. Sharabdar Dam

Gallery

References

Sources

External links 

 Livius.org: Shushtar
 UNESCO: World heritage site

History of Khuzestan Province
Sasanian architecture
Science and technology in Iran
Buildings and structures in Iran
Water supply and sanitation in Iran
World Heritage Sites in Iran
Buildings and structures in Khuzestan Province
Tourist attractions in Khuzestan Province